The Philadelphia Experiment is a 2001 studio album by the Philadelphia Experiment, a collaborative project including pianist Uri Caine, bassist Christian McBride, and drummer Ahmir "Questlove" Thompson. It features guest appearances from guitarist Pat Martino, trumpeter John Swana, and cellist Larry Gold. It peaked at number 7 on the Billboard Jazz Albums chart.

Background
The album is the first entry in a series devoted to musicians from the same cities but different musical genres, the second being The Detroit Experiment (2003) and the third being The Harlem Experiment (2007). The title "The Philadelphia Experiment" describes the bringing together of Philadelphia-based musicians from differing backgrounds (Caine was known for working in classical and jazz; McBride in jazz; and Thompson in rap and R&B).

In 2002, King Britt released a remix album, titled The Philadelphia Experiment Remixed.

Critical reception
David R. Adler of AllMusic gave the album 4 stars out of 5, calling it "a textbook example of how jazz, soul, and hip-hop were becoming deeply intertwined at the outset of the new millennium." Todd S. Jenkins of All About Jazz said, "Here, three tight homeboys have distilled the essence of the Philly legacy down into one insanely funky disc that commands repeat listenings."

Track listing

Personnel
Credits adapted from liner notes.

 Uri Caine – electric piano, acoustic piano, organ
 Christian McBride – electric bass, acoustic bass
 Ahmir "Questlove" Thompson – drums
 Pat Martino – electric guitar (1, 2, 4)
 John Swana – trumpet (1, 5)
 Larry Gold – cello (10), arrangement (10)
 Aaron Levinson – handclap (2, 9), sound effect (2, 9), production
 Andy Blackman Hurwitz – executive production

Charts

References

External links
 

2001 albums
Ropeadope Records albums
Christian McBride albums
Uri Caine albums